51 (also known as After Dark Originals: Area 51 or Area 51)  is a 2011 American horror film directed by Jason Connery and starring Bruce Boxleitner and John Shea. It is part of the After Dark Originals lineup. The film premiered on the SyFy Channel on February 26, 2011.

Plot
Political and public pressure coerces the government into allowing two well-known reporters and their assistants limited access to the ultra-secretive Area 51. The group consists of 20-year news veteran Sam Whitaker (John Shea); his camera-woman Mindy (Lena Clark); Claire Fallon (Vanessa Branch), an ambitious writer, journalist, and head of an acclaimed news blog called The Fact Zone; and her cameraman Kevin (Damon Lipari). The four tour the base and things go well for a while, but when one of the base's "occupants" attempts to liberate both himself and those of his fellow species, Area 51 changes from being a secured government facility to a place of horror.

Cast
 Vanessa Branch as Claire Felon
 Bruce Boxleitner as Colonel Martin
 Rachel Miner as Sergeant Hannah
 Jason London as Aaron Schumacher
 John Shea as Sam Whitaker
 Andrew Sensenig as Dr. Keane
 Billy Slaughter as Dr. Haven
 Jillian Batherson as Gomez
 Lena Clark as Mindy
 Damon Lipari as Kevin
 VyVy Nguyen as Elisia

Reception
Dread Central gave 51 a mixed review, stating that they would "write this one off as being a bit better than average by Syfy standards but still below par by conventional standards". HorrorNews.net also panned the movie, writing that it was "an interesting concept, with mediocre delivery, and a scare factor of zero. It is lazy film making at its worst, and it is easy to understand why the movie sat in the can so long (six years) prior to being released. It was not worth the wait."

References

External links
 After Dark Originals' 51 website
 
 
 

2011 films
2010s English-language films
2010s science fiction horror films
American science fiction horror films
Films directed by Jason Connery
Syfy original films
2010s American films